The 1984 United States Senate election in Montana took place on November 6, 1984. Incumbent United States Senator Max Baucus, who was first elected in 1978, ran for re-election. He easily won renomination in the Democratic primary, and advanced to the general election, where he faced Chuck Cozzens, a former State Representative and the Republican nominee. Despite President Ronald Reagan's strong performance in the state that year, Baucus was able to easily win a second term over Cozzens.

Democratic primary

Candidates
 Max Baucus, incumbent Senator
 Bob Ripley

Results

Republican primary

Candidates
 Chuck Cozzens, former State Representative
 Ralph Bouma, retired farmer
 Aubyn Curtiss, State Representative

Results

General election

Results

See also 
 1984 United States Senate elections

References

Montana
1984
1984 Montana elections